A primer (also spelled prymer) is the name for a variety of devotional prayer books that originated among educated medieval laity in the 14th century, particularly in England. While the contents of primers have varied dependent on edition, they often contained portions of the Psalms and Latin liturgical practices such as the Little Office of the Blessed Virgin Mary. Medieval primers were often similar to and sometimes considered synonymous with the also popular book of hours. Primers remained popular during and immediately after the English Reformation among Protestants in the Church of England, where it developed into an Anglican and humanist educational tool for schoolchildren. Catholic editions were occasionally produced up to the 20th century, though their popularity as Christian texts waned as the word "primer" came to be associated with secular introductory textbooks.

Origins

While the etymology of the word "primer" in reference to a type of prayer book is unknown, its origins were in texts produced for laity in the 14th century that developed out of and in correspondence with editions of the breviary and the related portiforium. Liturgical historian Edmund Bishop forwarded the view that the contents of these primers were pious devotional developments from the Divine Office according monastic use that were gradually viewed as obligatory within those communities. However, it is likely that the distinction between these devotions and the Divine Office were maintained and understood by those employing them. The earliest of these accretions were the Seven Penitential Psalms and the Fifteen Psalms. Further additions came with the 10th-century ascendancy of the Little Office of the Blessed Virgin Mary.

Laity in Western Christendom would attend recitation of the Divine Office, with women noted to have said the prayers in a low voice. However, the time needed to thoroughly learn the intricacies of the breviaries were prohibitory to laypersons, and those devotions which were mostly invariable were adapted into primers. The introduction of the Office of the Dead and its variants of Matins and Vespers would, alongside the Little Office, form the basis of primers for several centuries. Editions of the primers would match the local liturgical use in their ordering of the Psalms, with known variations for the Roman Rite, Sarum Use, York Use, and Parisian practices. Standardization of these devotions and the early primers would generally occur within monastic communities and cathedral and collegiate chapters.

The 14th century saw the primer become a valued devotional text among the laity, a value modern historians have understood through its regular inclusion in wills from 1323 onward. Religious literature, including primers, accounted for a substantial proportion of all publications in England through the early 16th century. Bound books like primers were supplemented by a variety of pamphlets oriented towards private devotion, including adaptions of the Psalms, sermons, and religious educational texts. Since English demand outstripped domestic printing capacity, Parisian printers like François Regnault dominated the market for Sarum primers.

Pre-Reformation contents and variation
The contents of one primer dating from circa 1400 were:

The Passion of Jesus was heavily emphasized within medieval piety, forming the center of English private devotion akin to the centrality of the crucifix in the liturgy. Among the most popular devotions to the Passion that appeared within pre-Reformation Sarum primers was the prayer "Oh bone Gesu", derived from Anselm of Canterbury's Mediations. This and other primer prayers would also emphasize a kinship with Jesus that remained salient from the 14th century through to the Reformation. Another popular prayer in English primers was "Adoro re, Domine Jesu Christe, in crude pendentem". Commonly associated with the Wounds of Jesus, the prayer contained seven short sections and was connected to substantial indulgences. This prayer, which originated by the 9th-century and is found within the Book of Cerne, formed a significant aspect of English lay devotion both within and outside the primer.

It is from Dirige, the Latin word for the Matins and Lauds of the Office of the Dead as they were contained in primers, that the English word "dirge" is derived; Placebo and Dirige being among the first words recited of the evening and morning offices respectively. The Dirige, accompanied by gifts to the poor, would often be recited at funerals and during the "month's mind" and anniversary of a given death.

Typically, the liturgical contents of primers—both manuscripts and printed editions—would be wholly in Latin. While some late 15th-century English-language manuscript primers rendered the Little Office, the Office of the Dead, and the Psalms into English, printers in England would officially produce none that translated these elements into the vernacular prior to the independence of the Church of England. Pre-Reformation, the production of translations of the Bible or its contents was prohibited in England. To circumvent this, some early English Reformers and late Lollards successfully imported foreign-printed vernacular primers in the 1530s despite official efforts to suppress this trade. While importation would sometimes be restricted, at least 60 percent of English breviaries, books of hours, primers, and manuals came from abroad during the first half of the 16th century.

English Reformation and later primers

At least 116 editions of the Sarum primer were produced between 1478 and 1534; immediately prior to Henry VIII's full separation of the Church of England from the Catholic Church, an unreformed primer according to the Sarum Use was printed in Paris. The Reformation saw primers produced in a similarly proliferate fashion; in the 13 years following the 1534 break, 28 editions were printed in English. Reformed vernacular translations of the primer were officially authorized by the Church of England and printed that same year as English ecclesial independence. In 1535, printer and translator William Marshall collaborated with John Byddell to produce a second reformed English primer. In 1539, John Hilsey produced a more conservative translation that retained some Latin at the behest of Thomas Cromwell.

Another primer, King Henry's Primer–also in English and Latin–superseded these prior editions and included the English Litany of 1544 and additional devotions. An injunction accompanied this primer, imploring schoolmasters to use it in teaching children to read and learn prayers. Produced by Archbishop of Canterbury Thomas Cranmer, the new primer reflected his difficulty in liturgical reform. The king's primer, authorized directly by the monarch, was printed in at least two version in 1545. This primer would establish the pattern of English prayer books and private devotion for the next century, enabling and officially encouraging the laity to worship according to the public services of the church in their own home.

Henry VIII's primer was reprinted under Edward VI in 1547 and 1549, the latter with the revised Litany as present in the first Book of Common Prayer published the same year. The significant popularity of primers in the century preceding the Reformation has been identified as contributing English lay familiarity with the canonical hours–particularly the Psalms, prayers, and litanies–as contained within the Book of Common Prayer. The Sarum and York primer's wedding exhortation and a matrimonial homily were included in the 1549 prayer book, though the blessings of the ring and bride-bed present in the Sarum primer were deleted. These Protestantizing deviations were followed by a reversion to pre-Reformation Sarum primer formulas under the Catholic Mary I's reign. Despite Queen Mary's anti-Protestantism, many of the psalms and prayers in the authorized 1555 primer were in common with the 1545 king's primer.

A 1546 modified primer, Yny lhyvyr hwnn, by John Prise would become the first book printed in Welsh. This text lacked the canonical hours and featured significant humanist elements; its educational qualities have been compared to the later Elizabethan alphabet book and catechism, The ABC with the Catechism.

The restoration of Reformation principles with Elizabeth I's ascent to the English throne saw the primer increasingly associated with the catechisms also produced during her reign, as well as the Elizabethan Book of Common Prayer. The 1559 Elizabethan primer was part of Elizabeth I's broader efforts to restore traditional worship in a reformed context and was soon accompanied by two other authorized devotional books: Orarium in 1560 and Preces Privatae in 1564. Despite some reformed sentiments towards prayers for the dead, the Church of England's primers from 1559 until their gradual disuse retained the Office of the Dead but deleted Marian devotions. With the 1559 Elizabethan primer, both Matins and Vespers were consolidated under the name of Dirige. It was during this period that the primers increasingly lost their religious emphasis and were adapted into secular primer textbooks. These secular texts remained influenced by the patterns present in religious primers. By 1604, publication of devotional literature no longer required royal initiative. English Protestant devotional primers were occasionally published through 1870, with three Henrician primers reprinted by Edward Burton in the early 19th century among the most influential Oxford reprints of the period.

Catholic primers continued to see occasional production. Among them was a 1599 translation of the post-Tridentine Officium Beatae Mariae Virginis into English by Richard Verstegan and printed in Antwerp. John Dryden, England's first poet laureate, is thought to have translated several hymns found in a 1706 Catholic primer. A renewed edition of the Catholic primer was officially sanctioned in the early 20th century, but was coolly received and failed to attain the same popularity as in prior centuries.

See also
Book of Common Prayer (1552)
Edwardine Ordinals
Exhortation and Litany
Hornbook

References

Anglican liturgical books
Book of Common Prayer
Catholic liturgical books
Marian devotions
Roman Rite liturgical books
Welsh literature